Lilyanovo is a village in the municipality of Sandanski, in Blagoevgrad Province, Bulgaria. It is situated on the south-western foothills of the Pirin mountain range along the banks of the Sandanska Bistritsa river. The village is located on the road between the town of Sandanski and the Popina Laka recreational area in Pirin.

References

Villages in Blagoevgrad Province